Mistendorf is a small village located in Bavaria, Germany. It is in Upper Franconia, in the Bamberg district. Mistendorf is a constituent community of Strullendorf.

In 2009, Mistendorf had a total population of 545.

Geography
Mistendorf is about 8 kilometers east from Strullendorf.

Mistendorf lies in the nature park "Naturpark Fränkische Schweiz - Veldensteiner Forst."

Infrastructure

Factory
"Denzlein Josef GmbH" has a factory in Mistendorf; they make windows, doors, stairs and sunrooms.

Traffic
Mistendorf lies on the Staatsstraße 2188.

Culture
There are several community organizations in Mistendorf:
 Sports Club: "DJK-Sportclub Mistendorf 1983 e.V." 
 Volunteer Fire Department: "Freiwillige Feuerwehr Mistendorf"

References

External links
 History of Mistendorf (on the Strullendorf site), Accessed August 27, 2010 
 Denzlein 
 DJK-Sportclub Mistendorf 1983 e.V. 
 Freiwillige Feuerwehr Mistendorf 

Villages in Bavaria
Bamberg (district)
Strullendorf